Fordy Wood Copse is a woodland in Devon, England, near Sandford. It is owned and managed by the Woodland Trust.

References

Forests and woodlands of Devon